Les Boullereaux-Champigny is a French railway station in Champigny-sur-Marne, Val-de-Marne department, at kilometric point 18.473 of the Paris-Est–Mulhouse-Ville railway.

The station 
The station opened on 13 January 1974 as the railway became electrified between Noisy-le-Sec and Tournan. It was renovated and platforms were raised when RER E service started on branch E4, on 30 August 1999. It is named after a district of Champigny-sur-Marne.

Service 
The station is served in both directions by one train every 15 minutes off-peak, during peak times and at evening. More than 79 trains toward Haussmann–Saint-Lazare and 78 trains toward Villiers-sur-Marne and Tournan (at evening) call at the station.

Connections 
Several buses stop near the station:
 RATP Group bus lines 106, 110 and 116
 Noctilien night lines N130

See also 
 List of RER stations
 Paris-Est–Mulhouse-Ville railway
 RER E

External links
 

Réseau Express Régional stations
Railway stations in Val-de-Marne
Railway stations in France opened in 1974